Syrastrenopsis is a genus of moths in the family Lasiocampidae. The genus was erected by Karl Grünberg in 1914.

Species
Based on Lepidoptera and Some Other Life Forms:
Syrastrenopsis moltrechti Grünberg, 1914 Ussuri, Russia
Syrastrenopsis kawabei Kishida Taiwan
Syrastrenopsis imperiatus Zolotuhin, 2001 Yunnan, China
Syrastrenopsis inthanonensis Orhant, 2001 northern Thailand

External links

Lasiocampidae